Gordon Cuthbert Griffin M.B.E. (born 19 December 1942) is an English actor, audiobook reader, casting director, dialogue coach, singer, composer and lyricist.

Early life
Griffin comes from Newcastle-upon-Tyne, though he was actually born at Gilsland in Northumberland, where his family temporarily located in wartime. He trained at Rose Bruford College.

Career
As a stage actor, he has half a century's experience of working in theatres up and down the British Isles, and in English-speaking productions overseas.  He took part in the first national tour of Godspell,  and played in Julius Caesar and in Murder in the Cathedral at Chichester Festival Theatre.  Other UK regional theatres where he has performed include Derby Playhouse and the Octagon Theatre, Bolton.

For twenty years he has been Casting Director for The English Theatre of Hamburg and has 
cast over fifty plays, including The Importance of Being Earnest, Twelfth Night, As You Like It,  Arms and the Man, Candida, Blithe Spirit, The Caretaker, Private Lives and The Circle, as well as the plays of LaBute and David Mamet.

As a cabaret singer he has performed with his singing partner Francoise Geller in the UK and elsewhere. 
He has composed music and lyrics for productions such as The Circle, Educating Rita, When the Reaper Calls, Over the River, Through the Woods and April in Paris.

His first film job, in Arabesque, required him to play a scene with Gregory Peck and Sophia Loren.

On television he has been a presenter on Play School, he played Inky in two series of Chips' Comic for Channel 4 and he spoke the first line in the first episode of Byker Grove.

Griffin has worked as a dialogue coach on Byker Grove and Kavanagh QC.

Through doing radio drama he realised that he could display great versatility with his voice alone, accessing a greater range of parts than would otherwise be possible. (For instance, in the late 'sixties when well into his twenties he took over the part of Billy the eldest grandson in The Dales, formerly Mrs Dale's Diary, who had previously been played as a boy with an unbroken voice, and played him till the serial ended.)

He 'got in on the ground floor' when audiobooks started to be recorded.  For many years he has been a voiceover specialist and has recorded nearly eight hundred audiobooks, mostly unabridged. The subjects have been as varied as Homer's Odyssey, Orwell's Nineteen Eighty-Four and novels by H. G. Wells and Jules Verne, as well as more modern writers like Hilary Mantel and Melvyn Bragg.  Also many titles in the Golden Age of Murder series for the British Library, and non-fiction titles such as Elegy: The First Day on the Somme, and Breakfast is a Dangerous Meal by Terence Kealey, among many others. AudioFile Magazine wrote: "Griffin is not just a narrator, but an artist of the Spoken Word.  He is in the top five of the most borrowed audiobook narrators in the world." In 2015-2016 his 2015 reading of Kate Ellis 's The Death Season  was the sixth most borrowed adult audiobook from UK public libraries, as reported by the Public Lending Right office.

His more unusual audio recordings include having been the courteous voice advising alighting passengers to "Mind the gap, please" on the London Underground.

In 2017, Griffin was appointed MBE in the Queen's Birthday Honours List "For services to People with Sight Impairment".

Publication

In 2020, Griffin published his memoir Speaking Volumes.

Selected Screen Credits
 Fanshawe in Arabesque 
 Len in Doctor in the House (TV series)
 Dr Ericson (lead) in Tableau of Love
 Sam in Doomwatch 
 Alistair in Apocalypse Watch 
 Vicar (lead) in The Gingerbread House 
 John Major in Westminster on Trial 
 Mr Flanders in The Fragile Heart 
 Michael Warner in Byker Grove (7 episodes)
 Francy Nolan in When the Boat Comes In
 Cyril Collier in The Likely Lads
 Doug in A Family at War

References

External links

Audio File Magazine's website

English male actors
Audiobook narrators
1942 births
Living people
Members of the Order of the British Empire
People from Gilsland
Actors from Northumberland